All the Good Times (Are Past & Gone) is the sixth studio album by Gillian Welch, the second solo studio album by David Rawlings (his fourth including his studio work with the Dave Rawlings Machine), and the first studio album officially credited to both Welch and Rawlings together. It was released in 2020 and won the 2021 Grammy award for Best Folk Album. All songs on the album are either cover versions of other artists or traditional folk songs that were given new arrangements. Welch and Rawlings have collaborated for many years, including many instances of songwriting, studio production, and touring together, but this album marked the first instance of their music released in conjunction.

Track listing

Personnel

Musicians 
 Gillian Welch – vocals, guitar
 David Rawlings – guitar, vocals

Other 
Produced by David Rawlings
Arrangement of traditional songs by Gillian Welch and David Rawlings
Recording and mastering by David Rawlings and Matt Andrews
Cover artwork by Peter Nevins and David Rawlings

Awards and nominations

References

2020 albums
Gillian Welch albums